George W. Sotter (1879 – 1953) was an American painter best known for Impressionist-style works. He was born and raised in Pittsburgh, Pennsylvania but eventually made his name in Philadelphia.  He is also known for his work in stained glass, some of which are still installed in numerous churches. In the August 5, 2006 episode of Antiques Roadshow on PBS, filmed in Philadelphia, a Sotter oil painting was appraised at $120,000 to $180,000, much to the delight of its visibly stunned owner. Sotter studied art at the Pennsylvania Academy with artist and teacher Edward Redfield, 1869–1965, member of the regional New Hope group. Later, Sotter became a member of the faculty at Carnegie Mellon University, 1910–1919.

References

1879 births
1953 deaths
Artists from Philadelphia
Artists from Pittsburgh
American stained glass artists and manufacturers
Carnegie Mellon University faculty
20th-century American painters
American male painters
People from New Hope, Pennsylvania
Pennsylvania Impressionism